is a Japanese, male adult video (AV) actor and singer.

Life and career

Tony Ooki was born in Tokyo on December 17, 1971. His father  was a Japanese actor. He was a boxer before he made his debut in AV in 2002.

Tony is widely known in Taiwan as "東尼大木" because he looks like Taiwanese singer Jay Chou. In Taiwan, his popularity as an AV actor is said to be "only second to Taka Kato". He created his own band "TonyBand" in 2014 and has composed original songs like GGININDER. Since then, he has performed several times in China and Taiwan with TonyBand.
 
He has an official Weibo account, although it became temporarily suspended during an act to clean the Internet by Chinese government in 2014. However, his account was restored not too long after the suspension. As of 2017, his Weibo has more than 500 thousands followers.

Filmography

Notes

References

External links 

 
 

1971 births
Japanese male pornographic film actors
Living people